Taipei City Constituency VI includes all of Daan in central Taipei. The district was created in 2008, when all local constituencies of the Legislative Yuan were reorganized to become single-member districts.

Current district
 Daan

Legislators

Election results

References 

Constituencies in Taipei